Katrina Kaif is a British-born Indian actress who predominantly appears in Bollywood films. She made her film debut in the 2003 heist film Boom, a box office bomb. She then played the titular princess in the Telugu film Malliswari (2004). Kaif had her first success in Bollywood when she appeared opposite Salman Khan in David Dhawan's romantic comedy Maine Pyaar Kyun Kiya?. The 2006 musical romance Humko Deewana Kar Gaye saw Kaif pair opposite Akshay Kumar for the first of many films, though the film was a critical and financial failure.

Beginning with Namastey London, the year 2007 marked a turning point in her career when all four releases proved to be successful at the box-office. Among these were two of the highest grossing productions of the year  the comedies Partner and Welcome. The following year, Kaif appeared in three films including the action comedy Singh Is Kinng. In 2009, Kaif received a nomination for the Filmfare Award for Best Actress for her performance in Kabir Khan's terrorism drama New York. Later that year, she starred opposite Ranbir Kapoor in the comedy Ajab Prem Ki Ghazab Kahani. In 2010, Kaif portrayed the role of a politician in Prakash Jha's political thriller Raajneeti and an aspiring actress in Tees Maar Khan. While the former was a box-office hit, the latter was a critical and commercial failure. Kaif starred alongside an ensemble cast in Zoya Akhtar's comedy drama Zindagi Na Milegi Dobara (2011). She received her second Filmfare Award nomination for Best Actress for her portrayal of a runaway bride in the romantic comedy Mere Brother Ki Dulhan (2011). 

In 2012, Kaif played the role of a Pakistani spy in Ek Tha Tiger, which became the highest-grossing Bollywood film of the year. The same year, she starred alongside Shah Rukh Khan and Anushka Sharma in Jab Tak Hai Jaan, a romance by Yash Chopra. Kaif played a brief role in the 2013 action film Dhoom 3. Kaif played Hrithik Roshan's love interest in the 2014 action comedy Bang Bang!, which was followed by several commercially failed films in the next three years. In 2018, Kaif featured in two most expensive Indian films of all time—the action adventure Thugs of Hindostan and the romantic comedy Zero, both of which were commercial failures. However, her performance in the latter was critically praised, earning Kaif the award for the Zee Cine Award for Best Actor in a Supporting Role - Female and a  nomination for the Filmfare Award for Best Supporting Actress. Her next releases, the period drama Bharat (2019) and the action film Sooryavanshi, were both commercially successful.

Film 

All films are in Hindi, unless otherwise noted.

Music videos

See also 
 List of awards and nominations received by Katrina Kaif

References

External links 
 
 Katrina Kaif on Bollywood Hungama

Indian filmographies
Actress filmographies
British filmographies
Hong Kong filmographies